Pedro de Valdivia Bridge is an arch bridge spanning Valdivia River, that separates downtown Valdivia from Isla Teja island a residential area.
Together with Río Cruces Bridge (built in 1987) it allows connection from Valdivia to the coastal town Niebla.

Pedro de Valdivia Bridge is named in honour of the founder of Valdivia the Spanish conquistador Pedro de Valdivia. It was opened in 1954 and survived the Great Chilean earthquake, the greatest earthquake ever recorded, while nearby buildings collapsed. After the earthquake it survived the effects of the Riñihuazo, a flooding caused by the earthquake.

References

Bridges in Valdivia
Arch bridges
Bridges completed in 1954
Bridges in Chile